Esternay is a commune in the Marne department in north-eastern France. Its sister city is Chatham, New Jersey.

See also
Communes of the Marne department

References

Communes of Marne (department)